Duerk is a surname. Notable people with the surname include:

Alene Duerk (1920–2018), American naval personnel
Jeffrey Duerk, American engineer

See also
Durk

English-language surnames